Roxbury 02119 is the second studio album by Boston-based rapper Ed O.G. & da Bulldogs. It was released on Chemistry/Mercury/PolyGram Records on January 18, 1994. The album peaked at number 36 on the Top R&B/Hip-Hop Albums chart. The album spawned two singles: "Skinny Dip (Got It Goin' On)", which peaked at number 19 on the Hot Rap Songs, and "Love Comes & Goes", which peaked at number 43 on the Hot Rap Songs.

Track listing

Personnel 

 Edward Anderson – main artist, vocals, producer (track 4), mixing (tracks: 4, 8)
 Gee Man – main artist, backing vocals
 T-Nyne – main artist, backing vocals
 DJ Cruz – main artist, scratches
 Dinitry A. Behrmann – additional vocals (track 5)
 Eric Jupiter – additional vocals (track 9)
 Larry Green Jr. – additional vocals (track 9)
 Shane "The Doctor" Faber – guitars & keyboards (track 3) 
 Joseph Kirkland – producer (tracks: 1–3, 5, 10), mixing (tracks: 1–2, 5, 10)
 Joe Mansfield – producer (tracks: 4, 6, 8, 11–12)
 Desmond Sharief Powell – producer & mixing (track 9)
 Scott Foster – producer (track 7)
 Smitt Dog – producer (track 4)
 Teddy Whiting – executive producer, mixing (tracks: 6–8)
 Kevin Keaton – executive producer
 Gregory Mann – mixing (tracks: 1–2, 5, 10)
 Richard Keller – mixing (tracks: 1–2, 9)
 Kevin Reynolds – mixing (tracks: 3, 10–12)
 Leo E. Okeke – mixing (track 4), recording
 Ivan "DJ Doc" Rodriguez – mixing (tracks: 6–8), recording
 Chris "The Wolf" Julian – recording
 Tony Dawsey – mastering
 David Brubaker – design
 Peter Bodtke – photography

References

External links 
 

1993 albums
Mercury Records albums
Albums produced by Diamond D